The Lower Lusatian Ridge Nature Park is a nature park and reserve in the state of Brandenburg, Germany. It covers an area of 580 km2 (224 sq mi). It was established on September 9, 1997.

Nature parks in Brandenburg
Protected areas established in 1997